Ian Moss (born 1955) is an Australian rock musician.

Ian Moss may also refer to:

 Ian Moss (album), his 2018 studio album
 Ian Moss (darts player) (born 1963), a former English professional darts player